Baeoalitriozus diospyri, the persimmon psyllid, is a species of Baeoalitriozus found in the United States and Mexico. The psyllids feed on Japanese persimmon as well as ornamental and native persimmons.

References

External links

 
Insects described in 1881
Persimmon